Julia (Rivard) Dexter (born September 17, 1976) is a Canadian sprint canoer who competed in the late 1990s and early 2000s. Rivard and her teammates finished ninth in the K-4 500 m event at the 2000 Summer Olympics in Sydney.  She has since become an entrepreneur in Halifax, Nova Scotia, and has held a number of positions in Canadian Olympic sport, Government Stewardship and in the Arts and Culture community.

Sporting career
Born and raised in North Bay, Ontario, Rivard was a successful multisport athlete, especially as an alpine skier and swimmer.  At one time she was ranked in the top ten in Canada in the 200m backstroke and 800m freestyle. She started her canoe-kayak career at the relatively late age of 19.  She moved to Dartmouth, Nova Scotia shortly afterward to pursue her training.  She was a member of the Canadian national kayak team for three years.

Rivard's career highlights include a fourth-place finish in women's K-4 500m at the 1998 World Championships in Szeged, Hungary.  In the 2000 World Cup events, she and her teammates won a pair of bronze medals, and also had a fourth- and a sixth-place finish.  Her competitive career concluded with a ninth-place finish in the K-4 500 m event at the 2000 Summer Olympics in Sydney.

Rivard is a member of the North Bay Sports Hall of Fame and the 2000 North Bay Female Athlete of the year.

Education
While still a national team athlete, Rivard completed a Bachelor of Recreation Administration degree at Dalhousie University in 2000.  In 2003, she completed her Bachelor of Graphic Design at the Nova Scotia College of Art and Design (NSCAD University). She continues to pursue education in the field of communication with a specific interest in Semiotics and its application in international relations.

Business
After graduation, Rivard founded an incubation center for independent creatives called Queen Street Studios in Dartmouth, Nova Scotia.  Queen Street Studios was a new business of the year finalist at the Halifax Chamber of Commerce's 2008 Halifax Business Awards, and was named one of the top ten Nova Scotia startups by the Nova Scotia Business Journal.  In 2006 Rivard was nominated for the Globe and Mail's Top 40 Under 40.

In 2008, Queen Street Studios merged with a successful web development firm called Norex.ca, a company that was founded in 1999 by Matt Rudderham, Farlan Dowell, & Brandon Kolybaba, taking on the position of Creative Director.  Under Julia's leadership, developer Chris Troup led the Norex team in developing a medal counter widget for the 2008 Summer Olympics in Beijing. The widget had over 3 million downloads during the games and was among the most successful Apple / Mac downloads during that period.  Later, Norex designed a similar results application for the 2009 ICF Canoe Sprint World Championships held in Dartmouth. The Norex group of companies was named the eighth fastest-growing company in Atlantic Canada by Progress Magazine in 2009, the sixth fastest-growing in 2010, and the second fastest-growing in 2011. Since then Norex re-branded to Code + Mortar  and Julia currently sits on the board.

Rivard was also a partner in Norex's sister company SheepDogInc.ca, Canada's first and most successful Google partner. In March 2010, SheepDogInc.ca  was one of only 40 partner companies to deploy a Google App, application called gTrax, in the launch of the Google Apps Marketplace. Rivard was brought in as Chief Executive Officer at SheepDogInc.ca and remained in that position until she sold her interest of the company in 2013.

Today Norex is led by Managing Partner Jenelle Sobey with partners Julia Rivard and Leah Skerry co-leading strategy as a members of the Board. Norex work has been recognized by the international Webby Awards for three years running representing their high standards and excellence in design and innovation. In addition to their websites, Norex has launched several successful innovation projects including SWELL a white-label crowdfunding platform for foundations, schools and not-for profits, Eyeread, a predictive assessment to help students learn how to read while offering teachers analytics to track their success and Pursu.it, a not-for-profit crowdfunding platform for athletes working to reach their dreams.

In May, 2018 Julia was recognized as one of the top 50 most influential Canadian women in STEM as a part of the Inspiring 50: Canada 2018.

Most recently, Julia co-founded Eyeread with a mission to raise global literacy through interactive video games designed to motivate learners to push their mastery of language learning. In 2016 Eyeread released Squiggle Park which later went on to be acquired and in 2019 they released Dreamscape which reached 3 million users in it first 24 months on the market.

In February 2020, Julia was elected as a member of the Board at Nova Scotia Power. Nova Scotia Power Inc. is a vertically integrated electric utility in Nova Scotia, Canada. It is privately owned by Emera and regulated by the provincial government via the Nova Scotia Utility and Review Board.

Sport and community leadership
Since 2002 Rivard has continued her involvement in sport as a volunteer. She started at CanoeKayak Canada as athlete's representative on the Sprint High Performance Committee, and then moved onto the Executive Committee as Vice Chair Athlete Relations.  She was Vice Chair of Marketing and a member of the CanoeKayak Canada Board of Directors for 13 years. She is a past Board member of Sport Nova Scotia and the Canadian Sport Centre Atlantic.  She is currently a member-at-large (B Member) of the Canadian Olympic Committee. In an operational role, Rivard has been to both the 2008 Summer Olympics in Beijing, and the 2010 Winter Olympic Games in Vancouver as a Team Services Officer on the Canadian Mission Team.  In that role she managed team operations at both Games.

In 2008, Rivard accepted an appointment to the Board of Directors for the 2011 Canada Winter Games which were held in Halifax. As a member of the Board her primary responsibilities included the development of the Games Legacy Plan, which includes a uniquely successful Arts and Cultural legacy managed through the Nova Scotia Talent Trust focused on the support of outstanding young artists who display excellence in their field.

Since 2011 Rivard has served as an alumni representative on the NSCADU Board of Governors. In 2013 Julia was appointed to the position of the Vice-Chair of the NSCAD Board of Governors and throughout her term lead the strategic visioning and planning process.

In 2012, Rivard was selected as a member of the Manitoba study group for the Governor General's Canadian Leadership Conference.

In February 2013, Rivard was one of 41 Canadian Olympic builders honoured with a Queen Elizabeth II Diamond Jubilee Medal. These individuals were selected for their contributions "work[ing] tirelessly behind the scenes to advance sport excellence in Canada."

In 2014 Julia was presented with the BMO Award for Global Growth and Innovation and was selected as a Finalist for Halifax Business Person of the Year.

Family
Rivard has four children: Oscar, born in 2002; Maximus, born in 2004; Phoenix, born in 2004; and Madeleine, born in 2014. Julia is married to Steven Earle Dexter of Halifax, Nova Scotia.

References

External links
 HIT Consultant: Top Promising Digital Health Companies to Watch
 Canada's East Coast Entrepreneurs Aim for Global Growth

1976 births
Canadian female canoeists
Canoeists at the 2000 Summer Olympics
Information graphic designers
Living people
NSCAD University alumni
Olympic canoeists of Canada
Sportspeople from North Bay, Ontario